Ceratopodium elegans is a species of fungus in the family Microascaceae

References

External links 

 Ceratopodium elegans at Mycobank

Fungi described in 1871
Microascales